Barry Wong is a Republican attorney and politician who previously served on the Arizona Corporation Commission and as a member of the Arizona House of Representatives representing the 18th district.

Education
Wong graduated from Arizona State University with a bachelor's degree in accounting, from the University of Arizona School of Law and from the Thunderbird School of Global Management.

Career
In July 2006, Governor Janet Napolitano appointed Wong to fill the vacancy on the Arizona Corporation Commission created when Marc Spitzer was named to the Federal Energy Regulatory Commission.

Elections
In 1994, Wong and Susan Gerard defeated Libertarians Richard Rupert and Chris Wilcoxson in the general election.

In 1996, Wong and Gerard defeated Democrat Ray Villa in the general election.

In 1998, Wong and Gerard were unopposed in the general election.

In 2008, Wong ran for a full term on the Corporation commission receiving 895,418 votes, losing the general election to Democrats Sandra Kennedy, Paul Newman and Republican Bob Stump.

References

External links 
Member page

Republican Party members of the Arizona House of Representatives
Arizona State University alumni
Thunderbird School of Global Management alumni
James E. Rogers College of Law alumni
American politicians of Chinese descent
Asian-American people in Arizona politics
Living people
Year of birth missing (living people)
Asian conservatism in the United States